Nicole Lattès (née Cousin; 20 February 1938 – 31 January 2023) was a French editor. She was known for founding  in 1993.

Lattès was born on 20 February 1938.

Lattès died on 31 January 2023, at the age of 84.

Distinctions

References

1938 births
2023 deaths
20th-century French women
21st-century French women
French women editors
Commandeurs of the Ordre des Arts et des Lettres